The 1987 LFF Lyga was the 66th season of the LFF Lyga football competition in Lithuania.  It was contested by 17 teams, and Tauras Taurage won the championship.

League standings

Playoff
Tauras Taurage 2-2 (3-2) SRT Vilnius

References
RSSSF

LFF Lyga seasons
football
Lith